This is a list of Florida Panthers award winners.

League awards

Team trophies

Individual awards

All-Stars

NHL first and second team All-Stars
The NHL first and second team All-Stars are the top players at each position as voted on by the Professional Hockey Writers' Association.

NHL All-Rookie Team
The NHL All-Rookie Team consists of the top rookies at each position as voted on by the Professional Hockey Writers' Association.

All-Star Game selections
The National Hockey League All-Star Game is a mid-season exhibition game held annually between many of the top players of each season. Twenty All-Star Games have been held since the Panthers entered the league in 1993, with at least one player chosen to represent the Panthers in each year except 1998 and 2011. The All-Star game has not been held in various years: 1979 and 1987 due to the 1979 Challenge Cup and Rendez-vous '87 series between the NHL and the Soviet national team, respectively, 1995, 2005, and 2013 as a result of labor stoppages, 2006, 2010, and 2014 because of the Winter Olympic Games, and 2021 as a result of the COVID-19 pandemic. Florida has hosted one of the games. The 53rd and 67th both took place at the FLA Live Arena.

 Selected by fan vote
 All-Star Game Most Valuable Player

Career achievements

Hockey Hall of Fame
The following is a list of Florida Panthers who have been enshrined in the Hockey Hall of Fame.

United States Hockey Hall of Fame

Retired numbers

The Florida Panthers have retired three of their jersey numbers. The number 93 was retired for Bill Torrey, who was President of the team from 1993 through 2001, and the number 37 was retired for Wayne Huizenga, who was owner of the team from 1993 through 2001. Also out of circulation is the number 99 which was retired league-wide for Wayne Gretzky on February 6, 2000. Gretzky did not play for the Panthers during his 20-year NHL career and no Panthers player had ever worn the number 99 prior to its retirement.

Other awards

See also
List of National Hockey League awards

Notes

References

Florida Panthers
Award Winners